Hypotacha antrummagna is a species of moth in the family Erebidae. It is found in Ghana and Tanzania.

References

Moths described in 2005
Hypotacha
Moths of Africa